Conserve may refer to:

 Conserve (condiment), a preserve made from a mixture of fruits or vegetables
 Conserve (NGO), an Indian environmental organization
 Conserve (publisher), a Dutch publisher
 Conserved sequence, a protein or nucleic acid that has remained similar throughout evolution

See also
 Conservation (disambiguation)